The Washington Nationals' 2009 season was the fifth season for the American baseball franchise of Major League Baseball in the District of Columbia, and the 41st since the original team was started in Montreal, Quebec, Canada.  It involved the Nationals attempting to win the National League East Division after a disappointing 59–102 season the year before.

On July 12, manager Manny Acta was fired and replaced with bench coach Jim Riggleman, though only as an interim manager.  Under Acta, the Nationals compiled an MLB worst 26–61 record in 2009 through the All-Star break and a 158–252 record in Acta's three seasons with the Nationals.  Riggleman would be named full-time manager in November 2009.

The Nationals finished the year with a 59–103 record, worse than the year before by one loss. For the second straight season, they finished with the worst record in Major League Baseball.

Nationals' third baseman Ryan Zimmerman won a Gold Glove Award as the best defensive third baseman in the National League and a Silver Slugger Award as the best offensive third baseman in the league. It would be the final season the Nationals lost a hundred games for 13 years.

Offseason
On November 3, 2008, the Nationals traded minor-leaguer Ryan Buchter to the Chicago Cubs for minor-leaguer Matt Avery. On November 10, 2008, they traded Emilio Bonifacio and minor-leaguers Jake Smolinski and P. J. Dean to the Florida Marlins for Scott Olsen and Josh Willingham.

Changed uniforms
For the 2009 season, the Nationals altered their uniforms.  The interlocking "DC" was removed from the star-spangled circle and moved to the left sleeve of both the home and away uniforms. It also has removed from the alternate red jersey and replaced with the "curly W" from the team's cap.  A new navy alternate jersey with the interlocked "DC" on the left chest in a "stars and stripes" flag pattern, which has also been emulated on the alternate navy cap, which was worn several times in 2009.  Finally, in a tribute to the former baseball teams in the District of Columbia, a script writing of the city name replaced the block lettering, emulating the Senators' script of the 1950s and 1960s – though as those teams used "Senators" on both their home and away uniforms, this marks the first time the "curly W" has actually appeared as part of the word "Washington" on an MLB jersey.

The uniforms gained notoriety when on April 17 in a game against the Florida Marlins, the jerseys of Ryan Zimmerman and Adam Dunn read "Natinals" on the front of the jersey instead of "Nationals" for the first three innings of the game. The Nationals did not catch the error as they only checked the back of the shirts, not the front, but were able to assign to Dunn and Zimmerman the correct jerseys later in the game. The company who manufactured the jerseys, Majestic Athletic, apologized for the error.

Advertising and marketing
The Nationals′ marketing and advertising theme for the 2009 season was "Natstown," capturing the idea that all Nationals fans at the ballpark, in the community, and in their everyday lives were participating in a single community centered around the team. The marketing campaign urged fans to "Get Your Red On," a reference to wearing the team's colors to show one′s team spirit.

Mascot
In March 2009, the Nationals introduced a new version of Screech, their bald eagle mascot who wears the home cap and jersey of the team. The original Screech who "hatched" at Robert F. Kennedy Memorial Stadium in 2005 during the third home game in Nationals history and had appeared at the team's home games during its first four seasons in Washington, was chubby, but the new Screech was slim. The Nationals explained that they had redesigned Screech because he had "grown up" and become a "teenager."

Spring training
The Nationals held their 2009 spring training in Viera, Florida, with home games played at Space Coast Stadium.

Regular season

Season standings

Record vs. opponents

Opening Day lineup

Notable transactions
 April 29, 2009: The Nationals traded minor-leaguer Kyle Gunderson to the Florida Marlins for Aaron Thompson.
 June 17, 2009: The Nationals sent Mike O'Connor to the San Diego Padres as part of a conditional deal.
 June 28, 2009: The Nationals traded Ryan Langerhans to the Seattle Mariners for Michael Morse.
 June 30, 2009: The Nationals traded Joel Hanrahan and Lastings Milledge to the Pittsburgh Pirates for Sean Burnett and Nyjer Morgan.
July 31, 2009: The Nationals traded Joe Beimel to the Colorado Rockies for minor-leaguers Robinson Fabian and Ryan Mattheus and traded Nick Johnson to the Florida Marlins for Logan Kensing.
 August 6, 2009: The Nationals purchased minor-leaguers Norris Hopper and Daryle Ward from the Chicago White Sox and traded Anderson Hernández to the New York Mets for minor-leaguer Greg Veloz.
August 31, 2009: The Nationals traded Ronnie Belliard to the Los Angeles Dodgers for minor-leaguer Luis Garcia and a player to be named later. The Dodgers sent minor-leaguer Víctor Gárate to the Nationals on September 2, 2009, to complete the trade.
 September 18, 2009: The Nationals purchased Jamie Burke from the Seattle Mariners.

Draft
The 2009 Major League Baseball First-Year Player Draft took place from June 9 to June 11. With their first pick – the first pick overall – the Nationals selected pitcher Stephen Strasburg. Other notable players the Nationals selected were pitcher Drew Storen (10th overall, a first-round supplemental pick they received for failing to sign Aaron Crow in 2008), second baseman Jeff Kobernus (second round, 50th overall), shortstop Michael A. Taylor (sixth round, 172nd overall), pitcher Taylor Jordan (ninth round, 262nd overall), pitcher Nate Karns (12th round, 352nd overall), and pitcher Marcus Stroman (18th round, 532nd overall). Stroman opted not to sign with the team.

Roster

Attendance
Finishing with the worst record in Major League Baseball for the second consecutive year, the Nationals drew only 1,817,226 fans at Nationals Park in 2009, placing them 13th in attendance among the 16 National League teams for the second year in a row. It was the lowest attendance total in their short history in Washington. Their highest attendance at a home game was on April 5, when they drew 41,290 for a game against the Philadelphia Phillies on Opening Day, while their lowest was 10,999 for a game against the Houston Astros on September 20. Their average home attendance was 22,716 per game, their lowest since arriving in Washington in 2005, but slightly higher than their average the following season.

Game log

|- align="center" bgcolor="ffbbbb"
| 1 || April 6 || @ Marlins || 12 – 6 || Nolasco (1-0) || Lannan (0-1) || || 34,323 || 0-1
|- align="center" bgcolor="ffbbbb"
| 2 || April 7 || @ Marlins || 8 – 3 || Johnson (1-0) || Olsen (0-1) || || 11,124 || 0-2
|- align="center" bgcolor="ffbbbb"
| 3 || April 8 || @ Marlins || 6 – 4 || Volstad (1-0) || Cabrera (0-1) || Lindstrom (1) || 13,308 || 0-3
|- align="center" bgcolor="ffbbbb"
| 4 || April 10 || @ Braves || 6 – 5 (10) || Campillo (1-0) || Beimel (0-1) || || 48,327 || 0-4
|- align="center" bgcolor="ffbbbb"
| 5 || April 11 || @ Braves || 5 – 3 || Kawakami (1-0) || Lannan (0-2) || González (1) || 34,325 || 0-5
|- align="center" bgcolor="ffbbbb"
| 6 || April 12 || @ Braves || 8 – 5 || Jurrjens (2-0) || Olsen (0-2) || Soriano (1) || 19,873 || 0-6
|- align="center" bgcolor="ffbbbb"
| 7 || April 13 || Phillies || 9 – 8 || Moyer (1-1) || Rivera (0-1) || Lidge (3) || 40,386 || 0-7
|- align="center" bgcolor="bbbbbb"
| – || April 15 || Phillies || colspan=6| Postponed (rain) Rescheduled for May 16 as part of a doubleheader
|- align="center" bgcolor="bbffbb"
| 8 || April 16 || Phillies || 8 – 2 || Martis (1-0) || Blanton (0-1) || || 20,494 || 1-7
|- align="center" bgcolor="ffbbbb"
| 9 || April 17 || Marlins || 3 – 2 (10) || Oviedo (1-0) || Rivera (0-2) || Lindstrom (2) || 19,026 || 1-8
|- align="center" bgcolor="ffbbbb"
| 10 || April 18 || Marlins || 9 – 6 (11) || Calero (1-0) || Tavárez (0-1) || || 19,860 || 1-9
|- align="center" bgcolor="ffbbbb"
| 11 || April 19 || Marlins || 7 – 4 || Oviedo (2-0) || Rivera (0-3) || Lindstrom (3) || 16,974 || 1-10
|- align="center" bgcolor="bbffbb"
| 12 || April 20 || Braves || 3 – 2 || Zimmermann (1-0) || Lowe (1-1) || Hanrahan (1) || 12,464 || 2-10
|- align="center" bgcolor="bbffbb"
| 13 || April 21 || Braves || 4 – 3 || Martis (2-0) || Kawakami (1-2) || Hanrahan (2) || 15,431 || 3-10
|- align="center" bgcolor="ffbbbb"
| 14 || April 22 || Braves || 1 – 0 || González (1-0) || Mock (0-1) || Soriano (2) || 15,567 || 3-11
|- align="center" bgcolor="ffbbbb"
| 15 || April 24 || @ Mets || 4 – 3 || Santana (3-1) || Olsen (0-3) || Rodríguez (4) || 40,522 || 3-12
|- align="center" bgcolor="ffbbbb"
| 16 || April 25 || @ Mets || 8 – 2 || Pelfrey (2-0) || Cabrera (0-2) || || 39,960 || 3-13
|- align="center" bgcolor="bbffbb"
| 17 || April 26 || @ Mets || 8 – 1 || Zimmermann (2-0) || Pérez (1-2) || || 40,023 || 4-13
|- align="center" bgcolor="ffbbbb"
| 18 || April 27 || @ Phillies || 13 – 11 || Happ (1-0) || Hanrahan (0-1) || Madson (1) || 41,620 || 4-14
|- align="center" bgcolor="ffbbbb"
| 19 || April 28 || @ Phillies || 7 – 1 || Durbin (1-0) || Lannan (0-3) || || 43,930 || 4-15
|- align="center" bgcolor="bbffbb"
| 20 || April 29 || @ Phillies || 4 – 1 || Olsen (1-3) || Myers (1-2) || Tavárez (1) || 36,351 || 5-15
|- align="center" bgcolor="ffbbbb"
| 21 || April 30 || Cardinals || 9 – 4 || Pérez (1-1) || Tavárez (0-2) || || 18,007 || 5-16
|-

|- align="center" bgcolor="ffbbbb"
| 22 || May 1 || Cardinals || 6 – 2 || Wellemeyer (2-2) || Zimmermann (2-1) || || 20,712 || 5-17
|- align="center" bgcolor="bbffbb"
| 23 || May 2 || Cardinals || 6 – 1 || Martis (3-0) || Piñeiro (4-1) || || 19,950 || 6-17
|- align="center" bgcolor="bbbbbb"
| – || May 3 || Cardinals || colspan=6| Postponed (rain) Rescheduled for July 23
|- align="center" bgcolor="bbffbb"
| 24 || May 4 || Astros || 9 – 4 || Lannan (1-3) || Wright (1-1) || || 14,115 || 7-17
|- align="center" bgcolor="bbffbb"
| 25 || May 5* || Astros || 11 – 10 (11) || Hanrahan (1-1) || Hawkins (0-1) || || 19,328 || 8-17
|- align="center" bgcolor="ffbbbb"
| 26 || May 6 || @ Dodgers || 10 – 3 || Kershaw (1-2) || Cabrera (0-3) || || 31,348 || 8-18
|- align="center" bgcolor="bbffbb"
| 27 || May 7 || @ Dodgers || 11 – 9 || Villone (1-0) || Wade (0-2) || || 37,074 || 9-18
|- align="center" bgcolor="bbffbb"
| 28 || May 8 || @ Diamondbacks || 5 – 4 || Martis (4-0) || Petit (0-3) || Wells (1) || 28,660 || 10-18
|- align="center" bgcolor="bbffbb"
| 29 || May 9 || @ Diamondbacks || 2 – 1 || Lannan (2-3) || Davis (2-5) || Hanrahan (3) || 27,247 || 11-18
|- align="center" bgcolor="ffbbbb"
| 30 || May 10 || @ Diamondbacks || 10 – 8 || Vásquez (1-1) || Kensing (0-2) || Qualls (8) || 25,079 || 11-19
|- align="center" bgcolor="ffbbbb"
| 31 || May 11 || @ Giants || 11 – 7 || Johnson (3-3) || Cabrera (0-4) || Wilson (8) || 23,934 || 11-20
|- align="center" bgcolor="ffbbbb"
| 32 || May 12 || @ Giants || 9 – 7 || Medders (2-1) || Beimel (0-2) || || 25,701 || 11-21
|- align="center" bgcolor="bbffbb"
| 33 || May 13 || @ Giants || 6 – 3 || Martis (5-0) || Zito (1-3) || Wells (2) || 30,120 || 12-21
|- align="center" bgcolor="ffbbbb"
| 34 || May 15 || Phillies || 10 – 6 (12) || Happ (2-0) || Wells (0-1) || || 23,430 || 12-22
|- align="center" bgcolor="ffbbbb"
| 35 || May 16 (1) || Phillies || 8 – 5 || Myers (3-2) || Olsen (1-4) || Lidge (6) || 19,910 || 12-23
|- align="center" bgcolor="ffbbbb"
| 36 || May 16 (2) || Phillies || 7 – 5 (6) || Carpenter (1-0) || Cabrera (0-5) || Condrey (1) || 23,896 || 12-24
|- align="center" bgcolor="ffbbbb"
| 37 || May 17 || Phillies || 8 – 6 || Escalona (1-0) || Tavárez (0-3) || Lidge (7) || 29,577 || 12-25
|- align="center" bgcolor="ffbbbb"
| 38 || May 18 || Pirates || 12 – 7 || Ohlendorf (5-3) || Mock (0-2) || || 14,549 || 12-26
|- align="center" bgcolor="ffbbbb"
| 39 || May 19 || Pirates || 8 – 5 (10) || Gorzelanny (1-0) || Beimel (0-3) || || 18,579 || 12-27
|- align="center" bgcolor="ffbbbb"
| 40 || May 20 || Pirates || 2 – 1 || Grabow (2-0) || Hanrahan (1-2) || Capps (8) || 17,854 || 12-28
|- align="center" bgcolor="bbffbb"
| 41 || May 21 || Pirates || 5 – 4 || Tavárez (1-3) || Gorzelanny (1-1) || Hanrahan (4) || 17,816 || 13-28
|- align="center" bgcolor="ffbbbb"
| 42 || May 22 || Orioles || 4 – 2 (12) || Báez (3-1) || Wells (0-2) || Sherrill (8) || 22,556 || 13-29
|- align="center" bgcolor="ffbbbb"
| 43 || May 23 || Orioles || 2 – 1 || Bass (3-1) || Tavárez (1-4) || Sherrill (9) || 31,833 || 13-30
|- align="center" bgcolor="bbffbb"
| 44 || May 24 || Orioles || 8 – 5 || Villone (2-0) || Ray (0-1) || Hanrahan (5) || 30,880 || 14-30
|- align="center" bgcolor="ffbbbb"
| 45 || May 25 || @ Mets || 5 – 2 || Maine (4-3) || Lannan (2-4) || Rodríguez (13) || 41,103 || 14-31
|- align="center" bgcolor="ffbbbb"
| 46 || May 26 || @ Mets || 6 – 1 || Hernández (4-1) || Stammen (0-1) || || 39,376 || 14-32
|- align="center" bgcolor="ffbbbb"
| 47 || May 27 || @ Mets || 7 – 4 || Santana (7-2) || Zimmermann (2-2) || || 40,171 || 14-33
|- align="center" bgcolor="ffbbbb"
| 48 || May 29 || @ Phillies || 5 – 4 || Happ (3-0) || Detwiler (0-1) || Lidge (10) || 45,202 || 14-34
|- align="center" bgcolor="ffbbbb"
| 49 || May 30 || @ Phillies || 9 – 6 || Hamels (3-2) || Martis (5-1) || Lidge (11) || 45,121 || 14-35
|- align="center" bgcolor="ffbbbb"
| 50 || May 31 || @ Phillies || 4 – 2 || Moyer (4-5) || Lannan (2-5) || Lidge (12) || 45,239 || 14-36
|-
| colspan=9 | *Game suspended by rain at 10–10 in the bottom of the 11th inning, completed on July 9 at Minute Maid Park.
|-

|- align="center" bgcolor="bbffbb"
| 51 || June 2 || Giants || 10 – 6 || Villone (3-0) || Howry (0-3) || || 17,331 || 15-36
|- align="center" bgcolor="bbbbbb"
| – || June 3 || Giants || colspan=6| Postponed (rain) Rescheduled for June 4 as part of a doubleheader
|- align="center" bgcolor="ffbbbb"
| 52 || June 4 (1) || Giants || 5 – 1 || Johnson (5-4) || Zimmermann (2-3) || Wilson (13) || rowspan=2| 16,787 || 15-37
|- align="center" bgcolor="ffbbbb"
| 53 || June 4 (2) || Giants || 4 – 1 (6) || Cain (7-1) || Detwiler (0-2) || || 15-38
|- align="center" bgcolor="ffbbbb"
| 54 || June 5 || Mets || 3 – 1 (10) || Green (1-2) || Hanrahan (1-3) || Rodríguez (15) || 20,353 || 15-39
|- align="center" bgcolor="bbffbb"
| 55 || June 6 || Mets || 7 – 1 || Lannan (3-5) || Maine (5-4) || || 31,456 || 16-39
|- align="center" bgcolor="ffbbbb"
| 56 || June 7 || Mets || 7 – 0 || Hernández (5-1) || Stammen (0-2) || || 31,841 || 16-40
|- align="center" bgcolor="ffbbbb"
| 57 || June 9 || Reds || 3 – 2 || Cueto (6-3) || Detwiler (0-3) || Cordero (15) || 16,274 || 16-41
|- align="center" bgcolor="ffbbbb"
| 58 || June 10 || Reds || 4 – 2 (12) || Masset (4-0) || Villone (3-1) || Weathers (1) || 19,766 || 16-42
|- align="center" bgcolor="bbffbb"
| 59 || June 11 || Reds || 3 – 2 || Tavárez (2-4) || Herrera (0-2) || Beimel (1) || 19,703 || 17-42
|- align="center" bgcolor="ffbbbb"
| 60 || June 12 || @ Rays || 4 – 3 || Howell (2-2) || Villone (3-2) || || 18,273 || 17-43
|- align="center" bgcolor="ffbbbb"
| 61 || June 13 || @ Rays || 8 – 3 || Sonnanstine (5-6) || Bergmann (0-1) || || 30,586 || 17-44
|- align="center" bgcolor="ffbbbb"
| 62 || June 14 || @ Rays || 5 – 4 || Wheeler (2-1) || Villone (3-3) || Howell (3) || 25,841 || 17-45
|- align="center" bgcolor="ffbbbb"
| 63 || June 16 || @ Yankees || 5 – 3 || Sabathia (6-4) || Villone (3-4) || Rivera (15) || 44,873 || 17-46
|- align="center" bgcolor="bbffbb"
| 64 || June 17 || @ Yankees || 3 – 2 || Lannan (4-5) || Wang (0-5) || MacDougal (1) || 46,052 || 18-46
|- align="center" bgcolor="bbffbb"
| 65 || June 18 || @ Yankees || 3 – 0 || Stammen (1-2) || Chamberlain (3-2) || MacDougal (2) || 45,143 || 19-46
|- align="center" bgcolor="bbffbb"
| 66 || June 19 || Blue Jays || 2 – 1 (11) || Colomé (1-0) || Frasor (5-1) || || 20,860 || 20-46
|- align="center" bgcolor="bbffbb"
| 67 || June 20 || Blue Jays || 5 – 3 (12) || Tavárez (3-4) || Richmond (5-4) || || 22,142 || 21-46
|- align="center" bgcolor="ffbbbb"
| 68 || June 21 || Blue Jays || 9 – 4 || Romero (4-3) || Martis (5-2) || || 26,610 || 21-47
|- align="center" bgcolor="ffbbbb"
| 69 || June 23 || Red Sox || 11 – 3 || Delcarmen (2-1) || Tavárez (3-5) || || 41,517 || 21-48
|- align="center" bgcolor="ffbbbb"
| 70 || June 24 || Red Sox || 6 – 4 || Lester (6-6) || Stammen (1-3) || Papelbon (17) || 41,530 || 21-49
|- align="center" bgcolor="bbffbb"
| 71 || June 25 || Red Sox || 9 – 3 || Zimmermann (3-3) || Smoltz (0-1) || || 41,985 || 22-49
|- align="center" bgcolor="ffbbbb"
| 72 || June 26 || @ Orioles || 11 – 1 || Bergesen (5-2) || Detwiler (0-4) || || 45,024 || 22-50
|- align="center" bgcolor="ffbbbb"
| 73 || June 27 || @ Orioles || 6 – 3 || Guthrie (6-7) || Martis (5-3) || Sherrill (16) || 39,633 || 22-51
|- align="center" bgcolor="bbffbb"
| 74 || June 28 || @ Orioles || 5 – 3 || Lannan (5-5) || Hernández (1-2) || MacDougal (3) || 25,068 || 23-51
|- align="center" bgcolor="ffbbbb"
| 75 || June 29 || @ Marlins || 4 – 2 || Nolasco (5-6) || Villone (3-5) || Oviedo (3) || 10,623 || 23-52
|- align="center" bgcolor="ffbbbb"
| 76 || June 30 || @ Marlins || 7 – 5 (7) || Pinto (3-1) || Beimel (0-4) || || 11,821 || 23-53
|-

|- align="center" bgcolor="ffbbbb"
| 77 || July 1 || @ Marlins || 5 – 3 || Meyer (2-0) || Tavárez (3-6) || Oviedo (4) || 27,032 || 23-54
|- align="center" bgcolor="ffbbbb"
| 78 || July 3 || Braves || 9 – 8 || Logan (1-0) || Colomé (1-1) || Soriano (8) || 33,982 || 23-55
|- align="center" bgcolor="bbffbb"
| 79 || July 4 || Braves || 5 – 3 || Lannan (6-5) || González (3-1) || MacDougal (4) || 23,708 || 24-55
|- align="center" bgcolor="bbffbb"
| 80 || July 5 || Braves || 5 – 3 || Olsen (2-4) || Lowe (7-7) || MacDougal (5) || 22,677 || 25-55
|- align="center" bgcolor="ffbbbb"
| 81 || July 6 || @ Rockies || 1 – 0 || Marquis (11-5) || Stammen (1-4) || Street (20) || 25,205 || 25-56
|- align="center" bgcolor="ffbbbb"
| 82 || July 7 || @ Rockies || 5 – 4 || Embree (2-2) || Tavárez (3-7) || Street (21) || 25,314 || 25-57
|- align="center" bgcolor="ffbbbb"
| 83 || July 8 || @ Rockies || 10 – 4 || de la Rosa (6-7) || Detwiler (0-5) || || 23,098 || 25-58
|- align="center" bgcolor="ffbbbb"
| 84 || July 9 || @ Astros || 9 – 4 || Arias (2-0) || Lannan (6-6) || || 25,490 || 25-59
|- align="center" bgcolor="ffbbbb"
| 85 || July 10 || @ Astros || 6 – 5 || Fulchino (3-3) || Beimel (0-5) || || 33,085 || 25-60
|- align="center" bgcolor="bbffbb"
| 86 || July 11 || @ Astros || 13 – 2 || Stammen (2-4) || Hampton (5-6) || || 30,052 || 26-60
|- align="center" bgcolor="ffbbbb"
| 87 || July 12 || @ Astros || 5 – 0 || Moehler (6-5) || Zimmermann (3-4) || Valverde (8) || 28,680 || 26-61
|- style="text-align:center; background:#bbb;"
|colspan=9| All–Star Break (July 13–15)
|- align="center" bgcolor="ffbbbb"
| 88 || July 16 || Cubs || 6 – 2 || Harden (6-6) || Lannan (6-7) || || 26,980 || 26-62
|- align="center" bgcolor="ffbbbb"
| 89 || July 17 || Cubs || 3 – 1 || Zambrano (6-4) || Stammen (2-5) || Gregg (17) || 27,581 || 26-63
|- align="center" bgcolor="ffbbbb"
| 90 || July 18 || Cubs || 6 – 5 || Wells (5-4) || Zimmermann (3-5) || Gregg (18) || 36,014 || 26-64
|- align="center" bgcolor="ffbbbb"
| 91 || July 19 || Cubs || 11 – 3 || Hart (1-1) || Mock (0-3) || || 34,574 || 26-65
|- align="center" bgcolor="ffbbbb"
| 92 || July 20 || Mets || 6 – 2 || Hernández (6-5) || Martin (0-1) || || 19,169 || 26-66
|- align="center" bgcolor="bbffbb"
| 93 || July 21 || Mets || 4 – 0 || Lannan (7-7) || Pérez (2-3) || || 23,390 || 27-66
|- align="center" bgcolor="bbffbb"
| 94 || July 22 || Mets || 3 – 1 || Stammen (3-5) || Pelfrey (7-6) || MacDougal (6) || 23,583 || 28-66
|- align="center" bgcolor="ffbbbb"
| 95 || July 23 || Cardinals || 4 – 1 (7) || Wainwright (11-6) || Balester (0-1) || || 25,359 || 28-67
|- align="center" bgcolor="ffbbbb"
| 96 || July 24 || Padres || 6 – 2 || Latos (1-1) || Mock (0-4) || || 23,506 || 28-68
|- align="center" bgcolor="bbffbb"
| 97 || July 25 || Padres || 13 – 1 || Clippard (1-0) || Stauffer (0-2) || || 21,834 || 29-68
|- align="center" bgcolor="bbffbb"
| 98 || July 26 || Padres || 3 – 2 (10) || Beimel (1-5) || Burke (2-3) || || 20,747 || 30-68
|- align="center" bgcolor="bbffbb"
| 99 || July 27 || @ Brewers || 14 – 6 || Bergmann (1-1) || Suppan (5-8) || || 37,311 || 31-68
|- align="center" bgcolor="bbffbb"
| 100 || July 28 || @ Brewers || 8 – 3 || Balester (1-1) || Villanueva (2-8) || || 36,502 || 32-68
|- align="center" bgcolor="ffbbbb"
| 101 || July 29 || @ Brewers || 7 – 5 || Parra (5-8) || Clippard (1-1) || Hoffman (23) || 32,992 || 32-69
|- align="center" bgcolor="ffbbbb"
| 102 || July 30 || @ Brewers || 7 – 3 || Gallardo (10-7) || Martin (0-2) || || 39,890 || 32-70
|- align="center" bgcolor="ffbbbb"
| 103 || July 31 || @ Pirates || 5 – 4 || Ohlendorf (9-8) || Lannan (7-8) || Capps (21) || 23,363 || 32-71
|-

|- align="center" bgcolor="ffbbbb"
| 104 || August 1 || @ Pirates || 11 – 6 || Vásquez (2-5) || Stammen (3-6) || || 26,855 || 32-72
|- align="center" bgcolor="bbffbb"
| 105 || August 2 || @ Pirates || 5 – 3 || Burnett (2-2) || Maholm (6-6) || MacDougal (7) || 21,894 || 33-72
|- align="center" bgcolor="bbffbb"
| 106 || August 3 || @ Pirates || 8 – 4 || Clippard (2-1) || Morton (2-4) || MacDougal (8) || 11,630 || 34-72
|- align="center" bgcolor="bbffbb"
| 107 || August 4 || Marlins || 6 – 4 || Villone (4-5) || Calero (2-1) || MacDougal (9) || 19,828 || 35-72
|- align="center" bgcolor="bbffbb"
| 108 || August 5 || Marlins || 5 – 4 || Lannan (8-8) || van den Hurk (1-1) || MacDougal (10) || 18,312 || 36-72
|- align="center" bgcolor="bbffbb"
| 109 || August 6 || Marlins || 12 – 8 || Sosa (1-0) || Ayala (1-4) || || 23,691 || 37-72
|- align="center" bgcolor="bbffbb"
| 110 || August 7 || Diamondbacks || 7 – 6 || Bergmann (2-1) || Gutiérrez (3-3) || MacDougal (11) || 22,674 || 38-72
|- align="center" bgcolor="bbffbb"
| 111 || August 8 || Diamondbacks || 5 – 2 || Mock (1-4) || Haren (11-7) || Sosa (1) || 24,551 || 39-72
|- align="center" bgcolor="bbffbb"
| 112 || August 9 || Diamondbacks || 9 – 2 || Martin (1-2) || Petit (2-6) || Sosa (2) || 19,938 || 40-72
|- align="center" bgcolor="ffbbbb"
| 113 || August 11 || @ Braves || 8 – 1 || Hanson (7-2) || Lannan (8-9) || || 19,273 || 40-73
|- align="center" bgcolor="ffbbbb"
| 114 || August 12 || @ Braves || 6 – 2 || Lowe (12-7) || Sosa (1-1) || || 17,886 || 40-74
|- align="center" bgcolor="ffbbbb"
| 115 || August 13 || @ Reds || 7 – 0 || Arroyo (11-11) || Balester (1-2) || || 16,889 || 40-75
|- align="center" bgcolor="bbffbb"
| 116 || August 14 || @ Reds || 2 – 0 || Mock (2-4) || Harang (6-14) || MacDougal (12) || 19,606 || 41-75
|- align="center" bgcolor="bbffbb"
| 117 || August 15 || @ Reds || 10 – 6 || Martin (2-2) || Cueto (8-10) || || 30,494 || 42-75
|- align="center" bgcolor="bbffbb"
| 118 || August 16 || @ Reds || 5 – 4 || Sosa (2-1) || Rhodes (0-1) || MacDougal (13) || 18,030 || 43-75
|- align="center" bgcolor="ffbbbb"
| 119 || August 18 || Rockies || 4 – 3 || Jiménez (11-9) || Burnett (2-3) || Street (30) || 18,192 || 43-76
|- align="center" bgcolor="ffbbbb"
| 120 || August 19 || Rockies || 5 – 4 || Marquis (14-8) || Balester (1-3) || Street (31) || 16,187 || 43-77
|- align="center" bgcolor="ffbbbb"
| 121 || August 20 || Rockies || 4 – 1 || Hammel (8-7) || Mock (2-5) || Street (32) || 18,036 || 43-78
|- align="center" bgcolor="ffbbbb"
| 122 || August 21 || Brewers || 7 – 3 || Looper (11-6) || Martin (2-3) || || 26,307 || 43-79
|- align="center" bgcolor="ffbbbb"
| 123 || August 22 || Brewers || 11 – 9 || Narveson (1-0) || Bergmann (2-2) || Hoffman (27) || 19,374 || 43-80
|- align="center" bgcolor="bbffbb"
| 124 || August 23 || Brewers || 8 – 3 || Stammen (4-6) || Parra (8-10) || || 21,460 || 44-80
|- align="center" bgcolor="ffbbbb"
| 125 || August 24 || Brewers || 7 – 1 || Gallardo (12-10) || Balester (1-4) || || 17,805 || 44-81
|- align="center" bgcolor="bbffbb"
| 126 || August 25 || @ Cubs || 15 – 6 || Mock (3-5) || Zambrano (7-5) || || 37,297 || 45-81
|- align="center" bgcolor="ffbbbb"
| 127 || August 26 || @ Cubs || 9 – 4 || Guzmán (3-3) || Bergmann (2-3) || || 36,562 || 45-82
|- align="center" bgcolor="bbffbb"
| 128 || August 27 || @ Cubs || 5 – 4 || Martin (3-3) || Wells (9-7) || MacDougal (14) || 35,174 || 46-82
|- align="center" bgcolor="ffbbbb"
| 129 || August 28 || @ Cardinals || 3 – 2 || Motte (4-4) || Bergmann (2-4) || || 40,033 || 46-83
|- align="center" bgcolor="ffbbbb"
| 130 || August 29 || @ Cardinals || 9 – 4 || Boggs (2-2) || Stammen (4-7) || || 44,028 || 46-84
|- align="center" bgcolor="ffbbbb"
| 131 || August 30 || @ Cardinals || 2 – 1 || Wainwright (16-7) || Mock (3-6) || Franklin (35) || 41,083 || 46-85
|- align="center" bgcolor="ffbbbb"
| 132 || August 31 || @ Padres || 3 – 1 || Stauffer (3-6) || Hernández (7-9) || Bell (32) || 19,867 || 46-86
|-

|- align="center" bgcolor="ffbbbb"
| 133 || September 1 || @ Padres || 4 – 1 || Richard (8-4) || Martin (3-4) || Bell (33) || 15,131 || 46-87
|- align="center" bgcolor="ffbbbb"
| 134 || September 2 || @ Padres || 7 – 0 || Correia (10-10) || Lannan (8-10) || || 14,468 || 46-88
|- align="center" bgcolor="ffbbbb"
| 135 || September 4 || Marlins || 9 – 6 || Badenhop (6-4) || Mock (3-7) || Oviedo (18) || 16,364 || 46-89
|- align="center" bgcolor="ffbbbb"
| 136 || September 5 || Marlins || 9 – 5 || Johnson (14-4) || Hernández (7-10) || || 18,111 || 46-90
|- align="center" bgcolor="bbffbb"
| 137 || September 6 || Marlins || 5 – 4 || MacDougal (1-0) || Oviedo (4-5) || || 22,325 || 47-90
|- align="center" bgcolor="ffbbbb"
| 138 || September 8 || Phillies || 5 – 3 || Martínez (4-0) || Lannan (8-11) || Madson (5) || 17,153 || 47-91
|- align="center" bgcolor="ffbbbb"
| 139 || September 9 || Phillies || 6 – 5 || Lee (13-11) || Clippard (2-2) || Madson (6) || 16,818 || 47-92
|- align="center" bgcolor="bbffbb"
| 140 || September 10 || Phillies || 8 – 7 || Hernández (8-10) || Blanton (9-7) || Villone (1) || 18,706 || 48-92
|- align="center" bgcolor="bbffbb"
| 141 || September 11 || @ Marlins || 5 – 3 || Martin (4-4) || Sanches (4-2) || MacDougal (15) || 15,247 || 49-92
|- align="center" bgcolor="ffbbbb"
| 142 || September 12 || @ Marlins || 11 – 3 || Wood (1-0) || Estrada (0-1) || || 38,214 || 49-93
|- align="center" bgcolor="bbffbb"
| 143 || September 13 || @ Marlins || 7 – 2 || Lannan (9-11) || Volstad (9-12) || || 15,065 || 50-93
|- align="center" bgcolor="ffbbbb"
| 144 || September 15 || @ Phillies || 5 – 0 || Lee (14-11) || Mock (3-8) || || 44,521 || 50-94
|- align="center" bgcolor="ffbbbb"
| 145 || September 16 || @ Phillies || 6 – 1 || Blanton (10-7) || Hernández (8-11) || || 44,223 || 50-95
|- align="center" bgcolor="ffbbbb"
| 146 || September 17 || @ Phillies || 4 – 2 || Hamels (10-9) || Detwiler (0-6) || Lidge (30) || 45,210 || 50-96
|- align="center" bgcolor="bbffbb"
| 147 || September 18 || @ Mets || 6 – 5 || Martin (5-4) || Pelfrey (10-11) || MacDougal (16) || 38,063 || 51-96
|- align="center" bgcolor="ffbbbb"
| 148 || September 19 || @ Mets || 3 – 2 || Redding (3-6) || Lannan (9-12) || Rodríguez (32) || 37,906 || 51-97
|- align="center" bgcolor="ffbbbb"
| 149 || September 20 || @ Mets || 6 – 2 || Maine (6-5) || Mock (3-9) || Rodríguez (33) || 38,347 || 51-98
|- align="center" bgcolor="ffbbbb"
| 150 || September 22 || Dodgers || 14 – 2 || Kuroda (8-6) || Hernández (8-12) || || 18,518 || 51-99
|- align="center" bgcolor="bbffbb"
| 151 || September 23 || Dodgers || 5 – 4 || Rivera (1-3) || McDonald (5-5) || || 18,635 || 52-99
|- align="center" bgcolor="ffbbbb"
| 152 || September 24 || Dodgers || 7 – 6 || Troncoso (5-4) || Villone (4-6) || Broxton (36) || 22,432 || 52-100
|- align="center" bgcolor="ffbbbb"
| 153 || September 25 || Braves || 4 – 1 || Vázquez (15-9) || Lannan (9-13) || || 28,276 || 52-101
|- align="center" bgcolor="ffbbbb"
| 154 || September 26 || Braves || 11 – 5 || Hanson (11-4) || Mock (3-10) || || 29,058 || 52-102
|- align="center" bgcolor="ffbbbb"
| 155 || September 27 || Braves || 6 – 3 (10) || González (5-4) || MacDougal (1-1) || Soriano (27) || 27,840 || 52-103
|- align="center" bgcolor="bbffbb"
| 156 || September 28 || Mets || 2 – 1 || Detwiler (1-6) || Figueroa (2-8) || MacDougal (17) || 18,600 || 53-103
|- align="center" bgcolor="bbffbb"
| 157 || September 29 || Mets || 4 – 3 || Clippard (3-2) || Green (1-4) || MacDougal (18) || 19,614 || 54-103
|- align="center" bgcolor="bbffbb"
| 158 || September 30 || Mets || 7 – 4 || Villone (5-6) || Rodríguez (3-6) || || 23,944 || 55-103
|-

|- align="center" bgcolor="bbffbb"
| 159 || October 1 || @ Braves || 2 – 1 || Clippard (4-2) || Soriano (1-6) || MacDougal (19) || 38,237 || 56-103
|- align="center" bgcolor="bbffbb"
| 160 || October 2 || @ Braves || 6 – 3 || Hernández (9-12) || Lowe (15-10) || MacDougal (20) || 33,124 || 57-103
|- align="center" bgcolor="bbffbb"
| 161 || October 3 || @ Braves || 6 – 4 (11) || Segovia (1-0) || Acosta (1-1) || Kensing (1) || 28,278 || 58-103
|- align="center" bgcolor="bbffbb"
| 162 || October 4 || @ Braves || 2 – 1 (15) || Kensing (1-2) || Logan (1-1) || || 36,307 || 59-103
|-

Player stats

Batting

Note: Pos = Position; G = Games played; AB = At bats; R = Runs scored; H = Hits; 2B = Doubles; 3B = Triples; HR = Home runs; RBI = Runs batted in; AVG = Batting average; SB = Stolen bases

Pitching
Table is sortable.

Note: Pos = Position; W = Wins; L = Losses; ERA = Earned run average; G = Games pitched; GS = Games started; SV = Saves; IP = Innings pitched; R = Runs allowed; ER = Earned runs allowed; BB = Walks allowed; K = Strikeouts

Team leaders

Qualifying players only.

Batting

Pitching

Awards and honors

All-Stars
 Ryan Zimmerman, 3B

Annual awards
 Gold Glove: Ryan Zimmerman, 3B
 Silver Slugger: Ryan Zimmerman, 3B

Minor League System
The future for the Nationals seemed to show promise in 2009 with their Gulf Coast League affiliate qualifying for the playoffs. The significance of this to the 2009 Major League team was that it demonstrated that the team was attempting to improve on its performance and had the prospects to do so.

Notes

References

External links

2009 Washington Nationals Season Official Site
2009 Washington Nationals season at Baseball Reference

Washington Nationals seasons
Washington Nationals
Wash